Doe Nunatak is a somewhat isolated nunatak, situated  west-northwest of Doescher Nunatak and  north-northwest of Mount Weihaupt in the Outback Nunataks, Victoria Land, Antarctica. The geographical feature was first mapped by the United States Geological Survey from surveys and U.S. Navy air photos, 1959–64. It was named by the Advisory Committee on Antarctic Names after Wilfred I. Doe, a U.S. Navy hospital corpsman with the McMurdo Station winter party, 1967. The nunatak lies situated on the Pennell Coast, a portion of Antarctica lying between Cape Williams and Cape Adare.

References 

Nunataks of Victoria Land
Pennell Coast